The 2022–23 First Professional Football League, also known as efbet League for sponsorship reasons, will be the 99th season of the top division of the Bulgarian football league system, the 75th since a league format was adopted for the national competition of A Group as a top tier of the pyramid, and also the 7th season of the First Professional Football League, which decides the Bulgarian champion. Ludogorets Razgrad are the 11-time defending champions. The season began on 8 July 2022. Due to the 2022 FIFA World Cup, the last round before winter break was held on 11–12 November. The league will resume on 11 February 2023.

Teams
From this season, the league was expanded from 14 to 16 teams, with 12 teams returning from last season, three teams promoted from the 2021–22 Second League, as well as the winner of the promotion/relegation playoff.

The first team to earn promotion from the Second League was Spartak Varna, who mathematically secured a top three finish after winning their game against Sozopol on May 5, coupled with Etar losing to CSKA 1948 II. Spartak return to the top level after a 13-year absence.

The second team to earn promotion from the Second League was Septemvri Sofia, who mathematically secured a top three finish after drawing with Sportist Svoge on May 9. Septemvri Sofia return to the top level after a 3-year absence.

The third team to earn promotion from the Second League was Hebar, who secured a top three finish in the very last round of the Second League, on May 21. Hebar return to the top level of Bulgarian football after a 21-year absence.

Additionally, Botev Vratsa managed to defeat Etar with a score of 3–2 in the promotion/relegation playoff, thus maintaining its place in the First League.

Stadia and locations

Personnel and kits
Note: Flags indicate national team as has been defined under FIFA eligibility rules. Players and managers may hold more than one non-FIFA nationality.

Note: Individual clubs may wear jerseys with advertising. However, only one sponsorship is permitted per jersey for official tournaments organised by UEFA in addition to that of the kit manufacturer (exceptions are made for non-profit organisations).
Clubs in the domestic league can have more than one sponsorship per jersey which can feature on the front of the shirt, incorporated with the main sponsor or in place of it; or on the back, either below the squad number or on the collar area. Shorts also have space available for advertisement.

Managerial changes

Regular season

League table

Results

Results by round

Season statistics

Top scorers

Most assists

Clean sheets

References

Notes

First Professional Football League (Bulgaria) seasons
Bulgaria
1